Rob Yeung (Ph.D.) is a British psychologist, business speaker, and management author. He has published research studies on personality in academic journals, particularly Personality and Individual Differences. He writes a column on confidence for UK newspaper The Daily Telegraph and contributes to newspapers including Financial Times, The Guardian and The Sunday Times. He appears on television programmes including CNBC news, Celebrity Big Brother, BBC Breakfast, CNN news, and Working Lunch on the BBC. He is a columnist for Accounting and Business, a periodical published ten times a year by the Association of Chartered Certified Accountants (ACCA).

He is a Director at Talentspace, a leadership consulting firm. He has a B.Sc. in psychology from University of Bristol and a Ph.D. in psychology from King's College London, University of London.  He is a chartered psychologist and Associate Fellow of the British Psychological Society.

He previously presented the BBC television series Who Would Hire You? in which real life candidates went through the recruitment process.  He also presented a further series for the BBC entitled How To Get Your Dream Job and has been an expert on Big Brother's Little Brother.  He assisted Jade Goody in her search for a personal assistant in the 2006 Living series Jade's P.A and Pete Burns in the 2007 series Pete's PA. He was the resident psychologist for the 2007 BBC Three series The Restaurant: You're Fried!.  He acted as resident psychologist on both Celebrity Big Brother and Big Brother in 2009.

Works 
 2020 – 10% Better: Easy Ways to Beat Stress, Think Smarter, Get Healthy and Achieve Any Goal
 2017 – Confidence 2.0: The New Science of Self-Confidence
 2015 – How To Stand Out: Proven Tactics for Getting Noticed
 2014 – How To Win: The Argument, the Pitch, the Job, the Race
 2013 – Confidence: Transform the way you feel so you can achieve the things you want
 2012 – You Can Change Your Life: Easy steps to getting what you want
 2012 – E is for Exceptional: The new science of success
 2011 – I Is For Influence: The new science of persuasion
 2011 – Confidence: The power to take control and live the life you want
 2010 – The Extra One Per Cent: How small changes make exceptional people
 2009 – Personality: How to unleash your hidden strengths
 2009 – Job Hunting for Rookies
 2008 – Confidence: The art of getting whatever you want
 2008 – Successful Interviewing and Recruitment (Sunday Times Creating Success)
 2008 – Should I Sleep with the Boss? And 99 Other Questions about Having a Great Career
 2008 – Should I Tell the Truth? And 99 Other Questions about Succeeding at Interviews and Job Hunting
 2007 – The Rules of Entrepreneurship
 2006 – Answering Tough Interview Questions for Dummies
 2006 – Public Speaking and Presentations for Dummies (co-written with Malcolm Kushner)
 2006 – The Rules of EQ
 2006 – The Rules of Office Politics
 2006 – The Rules of Networking
 2004 – Successful Interviews Every Time
 2003 – Coaching People
 2002 – Making Workshops Work
 2001 – Anyone Can Sell

References
 Archive of Accounting and Business magazine. Retrieved 2018-01-08.
 Television interview: How can you win more arguments?. Squawk Box television interview on CNBC. Retrieved on 2014-11-01.
 BBC Breakfast television interview. BBC Television interview. Retrieved on 2014-09-18.
 Six ways to deal with stress.  The Daily Telegraph 2010-01-11.
 Dr Rob Yeung is the Gok Wan of work and careers.  The Daily Mirror 2009-09-17.
 Trio of books by Yeung to Pan Macmillan.  The Bookseller 2009-07-23.
 CV advice. BBC Working Lunch. Retrieved on 2009-02-06.
 Speaker Biography. Rob Yeung profile on Celebrity Speakers. Retrieved on 2008-02-11.
 Reality TV show for interview expert. onrec 2005-05-09. Retrieved on 2007-07-27.
 Psychologist on Jade's PA. UK Gameshows. Retrieved on 2007-10-23.
 How to shine in interviews. The Daily Telegraph 2005-04-04. Retrieved on 2007-07-27.
 A faker's guide to mastering office politics. The Sunday Times 2006-06-15. Retrieved on 2007-07-27.
 The Restaurant: You're Fried!. Episode World 2007-08-30. Retrieved on 2007-09-02.
 Effects of personality and acute exercise on mood states. Personality and Individual Differences 1995-09-12.
 Big Brother's Little Brother episode guide.  TV.com episode guide.

External links

robyeung.com - official site
youtube - clip from BBC TV show 'Get Your Dream Job'
Amazon's Rob Yeung page - full list of books

Living people
Alumni of King's College London
Business speakers
British psychologists
Year of birth missing (living people)